The 2011–12 season was Raith Rovers's third consecutive season in the Scottish First Division, having been promoted from the Scottish Second Division at the end of the 2008–09 season. Raith Rovers also competed in the Challenge Cup, League Cup and the Scottish Cup.

Summary
Raith Rovers finished seventh in the First Division. They reached the second round of the Challenge Cup, the second round of the League Cup and the fourth round of the Scottish Cup.

Results and fixtures

Pre-season

Scottish First Division

Scottish Cup

<div style="margin=top:15px">

Scottish League Cup

Scottish Challenge Cup

Fife Cup

Player statistics

Captains

Squad 
Last updated 5 May 2012

|}

Disciplinary record
Includes all competitive matches.

Last updated 5 May 2012

Awards

Last updated 14 May 2012

League table

Transfers
Rovers started the season by releasing 16 players.

Players in

Players out

References

2011-12
Scottish football clubs 2011–12 season